Mike Smash and Dave Nice are two fictional television characters who first appeared in the early 1990s TV sketch show Harry Enfield's Television Programme. They were played by comedians Paul Whitehouse and Harry Enfield respectively.

They are parodies of a certain style of ageing celebrity BBC Radio 1 disc jockey who started out with the station in the 1960s and stayed there until the mid-1990s. The characters incorporated the personalities, character traits and lifestyles of several different real-life DJs. The characters reference such DJs as Tony Blackburn, Dave Lee Travis, Simon Bates, Alan Freeman, Mike Read, Peter Powell, Noel Edmonds and Jimmy Savile amongst others.

Enfield's parody of Radio 1's increasing irrelevance to the youth audience it supposedly catered for was a factor in Matthew Bannister's decision to terminate the employment of many older presenters when he became controller of Radio 1 in 1993.

The characters had their own TV special in 1994, following which Enfield retired them, reflecting the changes at Radio 1. However, they returned for Comic Relief in 1997. Whitehouse and Enfield also reprised their roles to present a special edition of Pick of the Pops in 2007, commemorating the 40th birthday of Radio 2 following the death of Alan Freeman. They have been called "one of the great comic creations of our time"

Development
Harry Enfield stated that his choice of characters for his show was a calculated move to gain the biggest possible audience by creating archetypes people could relate to.  Whereas he aimed many of his characters at a young audience, Smashie and Nicey were created for a segment of the programme designed to appeal to "older people". Enfield described them as "a bit more highbrow" than the other characters.

Character profile
"Smashie and Nicey" are two disc jockeys working at Radio Fab FM, a parody of BBC Radio 1. Each sketch would involve the two talking a stereotypically, obsessively self-regarding disc jockey spiel: reminiscing about their careers, modestly shrugging off their many works of "charidee", and generally being bland and irrelevant, before using a fader (in the form of a giant lever) to play their favourite record "You Ain't Seen Nothin' Yet" by Bachman–Turner Overdrive.

The characters reference a stereotype of Radio 1 DJs at the time, in that they are egotistical, bland, and out of touch with their younger listenership.

Mike Smash 

Mike Smash, played by Whitehouse, was loosely based on Tony Blackburn, although he resembled Noel Edmonds and Mike Read in appearance, his vocalisation had similarities to Mike Read and pop star Cliff Richard. His DJ persona is shown as more lightweight and chirpier than Nice, although he is revealed as a troubled individual in private. The television special introduced elements of Noel Edmonds and Jimmy Savile into Smashie's character, with the Nice character played out similar stories to those from the lives of Mike Read, Bill Grundy and Kenny Everett. In the 1994 TV special, reflecting real events at Radio 1, the DJs were sacked from Fab FM, in a manner that deliberately mirrored Simon Bates' and Dave Lee Travis' departures from Radio 1, being replaced with young, "irreverent" DJs. They were banished to "Radio Quiet" and left to reminisce about the "good old days" and pretend to themselves that they were still a powerful cultural force. One notable catchphrase used by Smash was "lodda work for charidee" (although he does not like talking about it). He also describes things "quite lidderally" (literally) and as "poptastic", "pop-a-doodle-doo", "popadopoulos" and other words beginning with "pop", which Nicey will change to "rock".

Dave Nice 

Played by Harry Enfield, quasi-Australian-accented ageing rocker Davenport "Dave" Nice was a mixture of the then Radio 1 Rock Show presenter Alan Freeman (whose radio persona, perhaps deliberately, bordered on self-parody) and Simon Bates, with elements of Dave Lee Travis and Tommy Vance. Nice was portrayed as more aggressive and angrier than Smash, liking heavy rock and being very opinionated. In the 1994 TV special Smashie and Nicey: The End of an Era he was shown to be a misanthropic alcoholic. He frequently mentions spending time with a "young friend" in his on-air chats with Smashie, and reveals in their private conversation during the record being played that the "young friends" are male.

Appearances
The characters first appeared in Harry Enfield's Television Programme in 1990 and continued to appear in the second series and a 1994 special entitled Smashie & Nicey: End of an Era.

The characters became very popular, appearing in adverts, featuring on their own compilation album, Let's Rock, and presenting episodes of Top of the Pops, including the 30th anniversary special edition on New Year's Day 1994. They were dropped by Enfield in 1995 after the changes at Radio 1 had removed the need for such satire, although they returned for Comic Relief in 1997.

Whitehouse and Enfield also reprised their roles to present a special edition of Pick of the Pops on 30 September 2007, commemorating the 40th birthday of Radio 2 and following the death of Alan Freeman. Dale Winton made the opening announcement but was quickly evicted by Smashie and Nicey who proceeded to play the top 40 from 27 September 1967.  During the show Nicey accidentally came out as gay (which was previously alluded to in the 1994 special, and may be an allusion to Alan Freeman's admission, also in 1994, that he had been bisexual before he became celibate). At the end of the show, he emotionally begged the Controller of BBC Radio to give him a job, "even if it's only on [fictional station] Digital Radio 8".

Dave Nice briefly appeared in the 2015 special An Evening with Harry Enfield and Paul Whitehouse, revealing that he had been cleared of "all but one of the charges" by Operation Yewtree, echoing what had happened to Dave Lee Travis.

Whitehouse reprised the role of Smashie for a two-part special Smashie's Xmastastic Playlist, which aired on Gold on 23 and 24 December 2017. It is revealed in these specials that Smashie is asexual.

1994 TV special
A TV special named Smashie and Nicey: The End of an Era was shown on BBC1 in 1994. The special begins in the 1960s, with Nicey presenting Blue Peter and dancing on stage with Freddie and the Dreamers in doctored footage of the band's appearance on the show performing "You Were Made for Me", interviewing The Beatles, and becoming a DJ on offshore station "Radio Geraldine" where Smashie is initially his teaboy. It combines elements from the careers of several real DJs, with Smashie seen hosting a Saturday night TV show called Smashie's House Party, a parody of Noel's House Party, and having turned his show into a plea for his wife (named specifically as "Tessa") to come back after she has left him, repeatedly playing Bobby Goldsboro's "Honey" (Tony Blackburn did precisely this in the mid-1970s when his wife, actress Tessa Wyatt, left him). Similarly, Nicey is revealed to have advertised "Deptford Draylons", alluding to Alan Freeman's ads for Brentford Nylons, to have interviewed the Sex Pistols (in doctored footage of their famous interview with Bill Grundy) and to have fronted The Dave Nice Video Show, a parody of The Kenny Everett Video Show. The duo are also said to have performed on the Band Aid single "Do They Know It's Christmas". Freeman himself makes a cameo appearance, as do Blackburn, David Jensen and John Peel. The programme was repeated on BBC Two in August 2015, however, some material (such as Smashie asking a member of the Top of the Pops audience how old she was) was edited out.

Relevance to Radio 1
The sketches proved very popular, largely because they reflected the image that Radio 1 had at the time. Much of the station's output was widely considered dull and unchallenging, and the average age of both listeners and presenters had risen above thirty, when it was intended to cater to a young audience. When Matthew Bannister arrived at Radio 1 in 1993 with a mission to rejuvenate the station, he referred directly to the characters in stating that his goal was to rid it of its "Smashie and Nicey image". Whitehouse later expressed his unease after being congratulated by BBC Director-General John Birt for assisting this process, stating that Birt was a "greater menace" than any of the DJs who were "harmless". In 1993, Dave Lee Travis commented on the characters in Q magazine, saying "This Smashie and Nicey crap that they keep bringing up. Is that funny? It doesn't raise a smile with me."

See also
BBC Radio 1 in the 1990s
Harry Enfield & Chums

References 

Comedy sketches
Comedy television characters
British sitcom characters
Male characters in television
Fictional DJs
Fictional radio personalities
Television duos
Harry Enfield
Fictional gay males